Dejan Tomašević (born 6 May 1973) is a Serbian professional basketball executive and former player. 

An All-EuroLeague Team selection on two occasions, he played with Borac Čačak, Crvena zvezda, Partizan, Budućnost Podgorica, TAU Cerámica, Pamesa Valencia, Panathinaikos, and PAOK, which he joined in September 2008.

Professional career
Tomašević started his career in 1990 with Crvena zvezda, where he stayed for 5 years, winning 2 Yugoslavian League championship titles. His next teams were Partizan (1995–99), where he won 2 Yugoslavian League championships and one Yugoslavian Cup title, and Budućnost Podgorica (1999–01), where he won 2 more Yugoslavian League championships and one Yugoslavian Cup trophy. The big transfer abroad for his career was realized when he signed with TAU Cerámica, where he played the 2001–02 season, where he won the Spanish ACB League and the Spanish King's Cup in 2002. He then transferred to Pamesa Valencia, where he won the ULEB Cup (now called EuroCup) in 2003, and finally on to Panathinaikos, where he won 3 Greek League championships and 3 Greek Cups, in the years 2006, 2007, 2008, and the Triple Crown in 2007. In September 2008, he signed a one-year contract with PAOK.

He was voted the EuroLeague Regular Season MVP of the EuroLeague 2000–01 season, and he made the All-EuroLeague First Team that same year, as well as the All-EuroLeague First Team of the EuroLeague 2001–02 season. He was also the MVP of the Yugoslavian League in 1998. He was also named the ULEB Cup Finals MVP of the 2002–03 season.

National team career
Tomašević was a member of the FR Yugoslavia national team (representing FR Yugoslavia) that won the gold medal at EuroBasket 1995 in Athens, Greece. Over three tournament games, he averaged 3.3 points and 3.0 rebounds per game. He was also a member of the FR Yugoslav Olympic team that won the silver medal at the 1996 Summer Olympics in Atlanta, Georgia, US. Over six tournament games, he averaged 6.2 points, 4.0 rebounds and 1.2 assists per game. Tomašević won the back-to-back gold medal at EuroBasket 1997 in Spain. Over eight tournament games, he averaged 4.5 points, 3.4 rebounds and 0.4 assists per game. He was also a member of the FR Yugoslavia team that won the gold medal at the 1998 FIBA World Championship in Greece. Over eight tournament games, he averaged 6.2 points, 5.7 rebounds and 0.9 assists per game.

Tomašević won the bronze medal at EuroBasket 1999 in France. Over nine tournament games, he averaged 7.2 points, 6.0 rebounds and one assist per game. Tomašević played at the 2000 Summer Olympics in Sydney, Australia, where he averaged 10.3 points, 6.9 rebounds and 1.9 assists per game over seven tournament games. He was a member of the FR Yugoslavia team that won the gold medal at EuroBasket 2001 in Turkey. It was his third EuroBasket gold medal. Over six tournament games, he averaged 6.7 points, 5.0 rebounds and 2.5 assists per game. Tomašević won the back-to-back gold medal at the 2002 FIBA World Championship in Indianapolis, Indiana, U.S. Over nine tournament games, he averaged 6.2 points, 5.1 rebounds and 1.9 assists per game.

As a member of the re-named Serbia and Montenegro national team, Tomašević played at the 2004 Summer Olympics in Athens, Greece, where he averaged 7.2 points, 9.2 rebounds and 2.4 assists per game over five tournament games. He was ranked second overall in rebounds per game, behind Yao Ming.

Post-playing career

Basketball Federation of Serbia (2011–2019) 
In April 2011, Tomašević became the vice-president of the Basketball Federation of Serbia in charge for competitions. In October 2015, Tomašević was appointed as an acting Secretary General for the Basketball Federation of Serbia. In February 2016, he became Secretary General of the Federation. On November 20, 2019, Tomašević resigned as the Secretary General.

In March 2019, the Federation put forward a nomination of Tomašević for the president of the FIBA Europe. On May 25, Tomašević lost the 2019 FIBA Europe Presidential elections from Turgay Demirel, who was re-elected.

References

External links

 Dejan Tomasevic at sports-reference.com
 Dejan Tomasevic at euroleague.net
 Eurobasket.com Dejan Tomasevic at eurobasket.com 
 FIBAEurope.com Profile
 Dejan Tomašević Profile On Baloncestistas

1973 births
Living people
Basketball players at the 1996 Summer Olympics
Basketball players at the 2000 Summer Olympics
Basketball players at the 2004 Summer Olympics
Centers (basketball)
FIBA EuroBasket-winning players
KK Budućnost players
KK Crvena zvezda players
KK Partizan players
Liga ACB players
Medalists at the 1996 Summer Olympics
Olympic basketball players of Serbia and Montenegro
Olympic basketball players of Yugoslavia
Olympic silver medalists for Serbia and Montenegro
Olympic medalists in basketball
Panathinaikos B.C. players
P.A.O.K. BC players
Saski Baskonia players
Serbian men's basketball players
Serbian basketball executives and administrators
Serbian expatriate basketball people in Greece
Serbian expatriate basketball people in Montenegro
Serbian expatriate basketball people in Spain
Basketball players from Belgrade
Valencia Basket players
Yugoslav men's basketball players
FIBA World Championship-winning players
2002 FIBA World Championship players
1998 FIBA World Championship players